Mirrors is the fourth studio album from American singer and songwriter Nivea, released on September 26, 2019 by Hill Music Group. Mirrors musically differs from Nivea's previous albums.

The album serves as a follow-up to her third album Animalistic (2006) and her first studio album in almost a decade. It features production from Nivea herself, Derrian Barnett, Twanbeatmaker, PlayBoy David Luke Jr., J. Wells, Stephen Wimberly and Delroy Ford.

Singles 
The album's lead single, "Circles" was released on September 29, 2018, along with the accompanying music video.

Track listing 
Credits are adapted from the album's liner notes and Tidal.

Notes
  signifies a co-producer
  signifies an additional producer

Charts

See also
 2019 in American music

References

2019 albums
Nivea (singer) albums
Contemporary R&B albums by American artists
Electronic albums by American artists